This is a list of people from County Donegal.

Sport
Packie Bonner, former Glasgow Celtic and Republic of Ireland goalkeeper
Séamus Coleman plays right back for Everton and Republic of Ireland
Philip Deignan, former professional cyclist
Ronan McLaughlin, former professional cyclist
Gary Doherty, former professional association football player
John Dunleavy, Sligo Rovers F.C. centre-back
Sharon Foley, international athlete
Dave Gallaher, former New Zealand Rugby Union player and captain
Shay Given, former Republic of Ireland and current Stoke City goalkeeper
Caitriona Jennings, international athlete and Olympian
Sinéad Lynch, Olympic rowing finalist
Conrad Logan, Rochdale A.F.C. goalkeeper
Brian McEniff, former Gaelic Athletic Association county manager
Michael Murphy, Gaelic Football player
Colm McFadden, Gaelic Football player
Kevin McHugh, Finn Harps F.C. under-15 manager
Carl McHugh, ATK Mohun Bagan FC association football defender
Stephen McLaughlin, Mansfield Town F.C. winger
Larissa Muldoon, Ireland women's Rugby Union scrum-half
Jason Quigley, professional boxer
Ricky Simms, London-based manager of Usain Bolt; Simms is a native of Milford
Nora Stapleton, Ireland women's Rugby Union fly-half
Mark English, middle-distance runner

Churchmen
Adomnán – also known as Saint Eunan; Abbot of Iona 679–704.
Columba – or Saint Colmcille, one of the three patron saints of Ireland.
Francis Alison – prominent Presbyterian minister in the Thirteen Colonies and a leading member of the Synod of the Trinity. At least three of the signatories of the United States Declaration of Independence were former students of Alison, who was born and raised in the Parish of Leck, on the outskirts of Letterkenny.
Stopford Brooke – Anglican and, later, Unitarian clergyman and literary historian. He served as chaplain to The Crown Princess Friedrich of Prussia, 1863–1865, and later served as chaplain-in-ordinary to her mother, Queen Victoria, 1875–1880. Was born and raised in Glendowan, just west of Letterkenny.
Michael Cardinal Logue, Catholic Primate of All Ireland and Archbishop of Armagh, 1887-1924. From Kilmacrennan, he was the first Donegal person to be created a cardinal.
The Rev. Francis Makemie – founder of Presbyterianism in what later became the United States. He was from Ramelton.
Patrick Cardinal O'Donnell, Catholic Primate of All Ireland and Archbishop of Armagh, 1924-1927. He was from Kilraine, just outside Glenties.
George Simms – Church of Ireland Primate of All Ireland and Archbishop of Armagh. A well known historian, he was from Lifford.

Arts

Music
Altan, folk band
Moya Brennan, Celtic folk singer
Clannad, folk band
John Doherty, fiddler
Enya, singer
Aoife Ní Fhearraigh, singer
Rory Gallagher, blues/folk singer
Conal Gallen, singer
Mickey Joe Harte, singer/songwriter
Mairéad Ní Mhaonaigh, fiddler
Lee Mulhern, singer/songwriter, member Of Stateside
Daniel O'Donnell, singer
Margo O'Donnell, singer
Proinsias Ó Maonaigh, fiddler
Tommy Peoples, fiddler
The Revs, indie rock band

Literary
William Allingham, poet
E. Rentoul Esler, Late Victorian and Edwardian era novelist. Born in Manorcunningham.
Neil McBride poet, author
Frank McGuinness, playwright, poet, translator
Mícheál Ó Cléirigh, one of the Four Masters
Séamus Ó Grianna, writer
Cathal Ó Searcaigh, poet
John Toland, philosopher, writer
Patrick MacGill, writer
 Annemarie Ní Churreáin, poet

Artists
Felim Egan, painter
Kenneth King (artist)
Patsaí Dan Mac Ruairí, painter and "King of Tory"
Sheila McClean, painter
Kevin Sharkey, painter

Actors
Ray McAnally, actor
Keith McErlean, actor
Seán McGinley, actor
Gavin Ó Fearraigh, actor, model
Art Parkinson, actor
John D Ruddy, actor
Andrew Simpson, actor

Film
Gerard Lough, Film director

Politics
Ian Anderson, prominent Manx politician who was a long-serving member of the Tynwald. From Rathmullan.
Harry Blaney, former Irish politician
Neil Blaney, former Irish politician
Niall Blaney, Irish politician
Brian Brady, Irish politician
Joseph Brennan, Irish politician
Isaac Butt, barrister, Member of Parliament and founder of the Home Rule movement. Born and raised in Glenfin, a district near Ballybofey.
Francis Campbell, former American politician
Sir Bob Cooper, former Deputy Leader of the Alliance Party of Northern Ireland and formerly the long-serving head of the Equality Commission for Northern Ireland. Born and raised in East Donegal.
Mary Coughlan, former Tánaiste and former TD for Donegal South-West. First woman to be appointed as Minister for Agriculture, Food and the Marine in the Irish Government.
Pat "the Cope" Gallagher, Irish politician
Tommy Gallagher, SDLP politician who was formerly an MLA for Fermanagh and South Tyrone
Paddy Harte, retired Irish politician
The Baron Hay of Ballyore, served as Speaker of the Northern Ireland Assembly, 2007–2014. Lord Hay of Ballyore also served as an MLA for Foyle up until 2014. 
Samuel Hays (1783–1868), American politician
Cahir Healy, journalist who was a very prominent Irish nationalist politician and who was a long-serving Member of Parliament for County Fermanagh. Born and raised near Mountcharles
The 4th Viscount Lifford, peer who once served as the Deputy Lieutenant of County Donegal. He also served as High Sheriff of Donegal, 1841–1845. Lord Lifford was also a prominent businessman in the county, serving as Chairman of the Finn Valley Railway c. 1860. He also served as Chairman of the West Donegal Railway. He sat as an Irish representative peers in the House of Lords, 1856-1887
Colonel Sir Michael McCorkell, British Army soldier who became a prominent Ulster Unionist Party politician in Derry. He served as Lord Lieutenant of County Londonderry, 1975–2000. Born in Buncrana.
Basil McCrea, formerly a prominent Unionist politician in the Northern Ireland Assembly. He was the leader of NI21 from 2013 to 2016, and was previously a member of the UUP. He was born in Ramelton.
Jim McDaid, Irish politician
Dinny McGinley, Irish politician
Joe McHugh, Irish politician
James McNulty, Irish political activist
Charles James O'Donnell, politician
Peadar O'Donnell, Irish Republican
Alexander Porter, U.S. Senator in the United States Senate.
Bríd Rodgers, former MLA who formerly served as SDLP Deputy Leader and was formerly Northern Irish Minister for Agriculture and Rural Development. Born and raised in Gweedore.
Patrick Stone, Member of the Western Australian Legislative Assembly

Other
Sir Alexander Armstrong, explorer, was educated at Trinity College, Dublin, and at the University of Edinburgh. He entered the Medical Department of the Royal Navy in 1842 and became its Director-General in 1869.
Sir George Bowen, colonial governor in the British Empire and author. He was born and raised at Bogay House, near Newtowncunningham.
William C. Campbell, winner of 2015 Nobel Prize in Physiology or Medicine, born in Ramelton
Vincent "Mad Dog" Coll, mafia enforcer in the United States of America
Columba, one of three patron saints of Ireland
Sir Jamie Flanagan, Chief Constable of the Royal Ulster Constabulary (RUC), 1973–1976. Sir Jamie was born in Derry but was raised near Killygordon in East Donegal.
Professor John Kells Ingram, economist, Irish patriot and poet who was based at Trinity College, Dublin
Major-General Sir James Murray Irwin, senior-ranking doctor in the British Army. From Manorcunningham
Robert Johnston, recipient of the Victoria Cross; rugby union international
Andrew Lewis, soldier
Hugh McLaughlin, inventor
Sir Robert Montgomery, colonial administrator in British India. Grandfather of Field Marshal The 1st Viscount Montgomery of Alamein, British military commander during the Second World War. Sir Robert was from Moville in Inishowen.
Henry Musgrave, DL, was an East Ulster businessman and philanthropist. Involved with many business concerns including the Donegal Railway Company.  In 1913, Henry Musgrave paid for a tower to be built on the Church of Ireland parish church at Glencolumbkille, near the family's country estate. He also left bequests to this church and Kilcar Parish Church in his will.  On 1 March 1917, Musgrave was made an honorary burgess of the City of Belfast. He was also grand juror and High Sheriff of Donegal for 1909–10 and was made Deputy Lieutenant of both the City of Belfast and of Donegal.
Hugh Roe O'Donnell, nobleman and soldier
 Walter Patterson, first British colonial governor of Prince Edward Island
Sir Gerry Robinson, businessman and former head of Granada Television
Pauric Sweeney, fashion designer
Frederick Young, from Culdaff was the founder of the Sirmoor Battalion later 2nd King Edward VII's Own Gurkha Rifles (The Sirmoor Rifles), the first Gurkha regiment to fight for the British.

See also
List of Letterkenny people

References

People
Donegal